Redvers is a town in southeast Saskatchewan, Canada. It is the first town one passes through travelling west from Manitoba on the Red Coat Trail, the path taken by the North-West Mounted Police on their March West in 1874, and now modern Highway 13. A statue of a Mountie on a horse can be seen just west of the intersection of Highway 13 and Highway 8.

The town has a public school, hospital, two banks, and other businesses and services. Like most towns in the area, its economy is based on farming, oil drilling, and various services.

History

The town was named after General Sir Redvers Buller in 1897. Buller was then fighting in the Second Boer War, and had earlier in his career commanded a company to quell the Red River Rebellion. The town was incorporated in 1904. Its centennial was celebrated on 30 July 2004.

Demographics 

Sports
Redvers is home to the Redvers Rockets, a senior men's hockey team in the Big 6 Hockey League.  It is also home to the Redvers A's of the Saskota Baseball League.

Climate

Notable Redvers people
Dean Kennedy - former NHL player.
Val Sweeting - Curler

See also
 List of communities in Saskatchewan
 List of towns in Saskatchewan
 Block settlement
 Redvers Airport

References

2021 Municipal Directory (http://www.mds.gov.sk.ca/apps/Pub/MDS/muniDetails.aspx?cat=2&mun=2175)

External links

Towns in Saskatchewan
Antler No. 61, Saskatchewan
Division No. 1, Saskatchewan